John E. Gallagher (February 15, 1958 - March 2, 2019; sometimes credited as John Gallagher and John E. Gallagher III) was an American television director. His credits include Third Watch, ER, The Good Wife, Criminal Minds and The Blacklist. Prior to working in television, he worked as an assistant director and production assistant on the films Friday the 13th Part VIII: Jason Takes Manhattan, Born on the Fourth of July, The Hard Way, Out for Justice, Stone Cold, Passenger 57 and other films.

References

External links

American film directors
American television directors
2019 deaths
Place of birth missing
1958 births